Jack of Clubs is the second album by Paul Motian to be released on the Italian Soul Note label. It was released in 1985 and like his previous album features performances by Motian with guitarist Bill Frisell, tenor saxophonists Joe Lovano and Jim Pepper, and bassist Ed Schuller.

Reception 

The Allmusic Review by Scott Yanow states: "The drummer's seven originals feature lots of variety in moods, ranging from witty to introspective and showcasing the colorful players at their best".

Track listing
All compositions by Paul Motian
 "Jack of Clubs" - 6:50  
 "Cathedral Song" - 8:32  
 "Split Decision" - 6:05  
 "Hide and Go Seek" - 4:26  
 "Lament" - 4:45  
 "Tanner Street" - 3:21
 "Drum Music" - 6:24  
Recorded 26–28 March 1984 at Barigozzi Studio, Milano

Personnel
Paul Motian - drums
Bill Frisell - electric guitar
Joe Lovano - tenor saxophone
Jim Pepper - tenor saxophone, soprano saxophone
Ed Schuller - bass

References

1985 albums
Paul Motian albums
Black Saint/Soul Note albums